The 1848 Pennsylvania gubernatorial election occurred on October 10, 1848. Incumbent Whig governor William F. Johnston, who became governor following the resignation and subsequent death of Francis R. Shunk in July 1848, defeated Democratic candidate Morris Longstreth to win a full term.

Results

References

1848
Pennsylvania
Gubernatorial
November 1848 events